The Buxtehude Bull (German: Buxtehuder Bulle) is an award for youth literature, established in 1971 by Winfried Ziemann, a local book merchant from Buxtehude, a Hanseatic City located in the Hamburg Metropolitan Region. The town council took over the sponsorship of the award in 1981. The award is given annually to the best children's or young-adults' book published in German (either native language or translated) in the preceding year. The writer is presented with a small steel statue of the bull (German: Bulle)  Ferdinand, from the popular work The Story of Ferdinand by Munro Leaf, and also receives a monetary prize  of €5,000.

Awards

 1971: Alexander Sutherland Neill, Die grüne Wolke
 1972: Cili Wethekam, Tignasse, Kind der Revolution
 1973: Tilman Röhrig, Thoms Bericht
 1974: Gail Graham, Zwischen den Feuern
 1975: Johanna Reiss, Und im Fenster der Himmel
 1976: Jaap ter Haar, Behalt das Leben lieb
 1977: Gudrun Pausewang, Die Not der Familie Caldera
 1978: Leonie Ossowski, Stern ohne Himmel
 1979: Michael Ende, Die unendliche Geschichte (The Neverending Story)
 1980: Hermann Vinke, Das kurze Leben der Sophie Scholl
 1981: Myron Levoy, Der gelbe Vogel (Alan and Naomi)
 1982: Rudolf Frank, Der Junge, der seinen Geburtstag vergaß
 1983: Gudrun Pausewang, Die letzten Kinder von Schewenborn (The Last Children of Schewenborn)
 1984: Mildred D. Taylor, Donnergrollen hör mein Schrei'n
 1985: Urs M. Fiechtner, Annas Geschichte
 1986: Joan Lingard, Über die Barrikaden
 1987: James Watson, Hinter vorgehaltener Hand
 1988: Isolde Heyne, Sternschnuppenzeit
 1989: Heidi Glade-Hassenmüller, Gute Nacht, Zuckerpüppchen
 1990: Maria Seidemann, Rosalie
 1991: Ursula Wölfel, Ein Haus für alle
 1992: Mecka Lind, Manchmal gehört mir die ganze Welt
 1993: Klaus Kordon, Der erste Frühling
 1994: Katarina von Bredow, Ludvig meine Liebe
 1995: Tonke Dragt, Turmhoch und meilenweit
 1996: Jostein Gaarder, Durch einen Spiegel, in einem dunklen Wort (Through a Glass, Darkly)
 1997: Ralf Isau, Das Museum der gestohlenen Erinnerungen
 1998: Andreas Steinhöfel, Die Mitte der Welt
 1999: John Marsden, Gegen jede Chance (Third Day, the Frost)
 2000: Sherryl Jordan, Junipers Spiel
 2001: David Grossman, Wohin du mich führst
 2002: Hanna Jansen, Über tausend Hügel wandere ich mit dir
 2003: Nancy Farmer, Das Skorpionenhaus (The House of the Scorpion)
 2004: Rainer M. Schröder, Die Lagune der Galeeren
 2005: Kevin Brooks, Lucas
 2006: Stephenie Meyer, Bis(s) zum Morgengrauen (Twilight)
 2007: Anne C. Voorhoeve, Liverpool Street
 2008: Markus Zusak, Die Bücherdiebin (The Book Thief)
 2009: Suzanne Collins, Die Tribute von Panem – Tödliche Spiele (The Hunger Games)
 2010: Susan Beth Pfeffer, Die Welt, wie wir sie kannten
 2011: Lauren Oliver, Delirium
 2012: John Green, Das Schicksal ist ein mieser Verräter
 2013: Christine Fehér, Dann mach ich eben Schluss
 2014: David Safier, 28 Tage lang
 2015: Victoria Aveyard, Die Farben des Blutes: Die rote Königin
 2016: Tamara Ireland Stone, Mit anderen Worten: ich
 2017: John Boyne, Der Junge auf dem Berg (The Boy at the Top of the Mountain)
 2018: Amy Giles, Jetzt ist alles, was wir haben (Now Is Everything)
 2019: Wendelin Van Draanen, Acht Wochen Wüste (Wild Bird)
 2020: Alan Gratz, Vor uns das Meer. Drei Jugendliche, drei Jahrzehnte, eine Hoffnung (Refugee)
 2021: Malene Sølvsten, Ansuz – Das Flüstern der Raben

References

External links

Children's literary awards
Awards established in 1971
1971 establishments in Germany
German literary awards